Robert Byng may refer to:

Robert Byng (16th-century MP) (died 1595), Member of English Parliament representing Steyning and Abingdon
Robert Byng (Plymouth MP) (1703–1740), British navy official, politician, Governor of Barbados from 1739 to 1740
Robert Byng (painter) (1666–1720), English painter